Gaza rathbuni, common name Rathbun's gaza,  is a species of sea snail, a marine gastropod mollusk in the family Margaritidae.

Description
The size of the discoid shell varies between 24 mm and 30 mm. The teleoconch consists of 4.5 weakly convex whorls. This species differs from Gaza superba  by being more depressed, with stronger spiral grooving, a slightly smaller umbilicus, and more flattened over the sutures. The periostracum is olivaceous, polished, very thin and readily dehiscent. The operculum contains about seven whorls, thin and polished, slightly centrally concave, with a narrow thinner band marginating the coil.

The soft parts recall those of Gaza superba, but the muzzle seems shorter and there are seven slender, rather long epipodial filaments on the right side, instead of five as in Gaza superba.

Distribution
This species occurs in the Pacific Ocean off the Galapagos Islands and the Gulf of Panama.

References

 Finet, Y., 1995. Marine Molluscs of the Galapagos: Gastropods. A monograph and revision of the families Trochidae, Skeneidae, Turbinidae and Neritidae. First edition ed. L'Informatore Piceno, Italy.
  Luiz Ricardo L. Simone & Carlo M. Cunha, Revision of genera Gaza and Callogaza (Vetigastropoda, Trochidae), with description of a new Brazilian species; Zootaxa1318: 1–40 (2006)

External links
 To USNM Invertebrate Zoology Mollusca Collection
 To World Register of Marine Species
 

rathbuni
Gastropods described in 1890